Linda Chapa LaVia (born August 16, 1966) was a Democratic member of the Illinois House of Representatives, representing the 83rd District from 2003 until 2019, when she retired to accept an appointment to the cabinet of Illinois Governor J.B. Pritzker. The district covers part of Kane County, including the city of Aurora. She was first elected to the Illinois General Assembly in 2002 defeating Bob O'Connor, an Aurora Alderman-At-Large, becoming the first Hispanic to win a seat in the state legislature outside of Cook County.

In 2014, Chapa LaVia made racial comments by calling state Representative John Anthony a "half." Anthony is black with Puerto Rican heritage. Chap LaVia later apologized for her remarks on the House floor.  In her apology she said, "I want to deeply apologize to my side of the aisle over here, my colleagues, my brothers and sisters for my personality meltdown yesterday."

On Tuesday, June 24, 2015, she announced her candidacy for Mayor of Aurora, Illinois However, she did not advance past the Aurora primary.

The daughter of Texas cotton pickers, Linda attended Northern Illinois University and enrolled in the R.O.T.C. program, later graduating and becoming an officer in the United States Army.

Chapa LaVia served as a delegate to the 2012 Democratic National Convention.

In 2018, Chapa LaVia was appointed to Governor-elect J.B. Pritzker's transition committee on Veterans Affairs. On February 15, 2019, Governor Pritzker announced that Chapa LaVia would be appointed the Director of the Illinois Department of Veterans' Affairs. Chapa LaVia resigned as Illinois Veterans Affairs director in January, 2021. A 2021 report from the Illinois Department of Human Services' Office of the Inspector General stated that systemic mismanagement by the Illinois Veterans Affairs department led to 36 deaths from COVID-19 at the LaSalle Veterans Home. The report specifically called out Chapa LaVia's abdication of her responsibilities.

Chapa LaVia, her husband, and two children live in Aurora.

References

External links
Representative Linda Chapa LaVia (D) 83rd District at the Illinois General Assembly
By session: 98th, 97th, 96th, 95th, 94th, 93rd
 
Linda Chapa LaVia at Illinois House Democrats

Democratic Party members of the Illinois House of Representatives
1966 births
Living people
People from Aurora, Illinois
Military personnel from Illinois
Northern Illinois University alumni
University of Illinois at Springfield alumni
Women state legislators in Illinois
21st-century American politicians
21st-century American women politicians
Hispanic and Latino American state legislators in Illinois